Al-Zakah (also spelled al-Zakat) is a Syrian town located in the Kafr Zita Subdistrict of the Mahardah District in Hama Governorate. According to the Syria Central Bureau of Statistics (CBS), al-Zakah had a population of 1,771 in the 2004 census.

References 

Populated places in Mahardah District